Pencader is a small village in the Welsh county of Carmarthenshire, and is part of the Community and Parish of Llanfihangel-ar-Arth. It is located around 3 miles (5 km) south-east of Llandysul and 6.5 miles (10 km) south-west of Llanybydder, in the valley of the Gwen brook, shortly before the confluence with the River Talog, to form the River Tyweli (a tributary of the Teifi).

It is a village of little more than 500 houses, two shops, two pubs and an Anglican church (St Mary’s). For many years, it was one of the main stops on the Carmarthen - Aberystwyth rail route, and was the junction for the service to Newcastle Emlyn; the Pencader Tunnel enabled services to reach Carmarthen via Llanpumsaint. The decline of the railways saw the Newcastle Emlyn branch line closed in 1952 and the main line closed to passengers in 1965.

History
A battle was fought here between Gruffydd ap Llywelyn and Hywel ab Edwin in 1041; Gruffydd was the victor, and went on to become the first and last King of Wales.

Pencader is the site of an old castle, which was probably erected by Gilbert de Clare, 1st Earl of Pembroke in 1145.

Railway

From 1845, a scheme was proposed to connect the industrialised Northwest England and Manchester to the deep water port at Milford Haven, to provide an alternative to the congested Port of Liverpool. The M&MR was absorbed into the GWR in 1911.

Under the Beeching Axe of British Railways, in 1965 passenger services to Pencader ceased, with freight and goods ceasing in 1973. The station was demolished, and the site is now a lorry haulage depot.

Notable people
 John Evans (1779 at Cwmgwen – 1847), a Welsh Methodist.
 Sarah Jacob (1857–1869), one of the so-called fasting girls
 Aled Hall (born 1968), Opera singer

Image gallery

Nearby areas

References

External links 

Village website

Villages in Carmarthenshire